Acharya Pujyapada or Pūjyapāda (464–524 CE) was a renowned grammarian and acharya (philosopher monk) belonging to the Digambara tradition of Jains. It was believed that he was worshiped by demigods on the account of his vast scholarship and deep piety, and thus, he was named Pujyapada. He was said to be the guru of King Durvinita of the Western Ganga dynasty.

Life
Pujyapada is said to have lived from 510 CE to 600 CE. Born under the name Devanandi to parents Madhava Bhatta and Shridevi, he was a sadhu Digambara monk, as well as a yogi, mystic, poet, scholar, author and master of several branches of learning. As the Devs from heaven used to come to do Puja of his feet Paad, the title of Pujyapaad was given to him.  He was heavily influenced by the writings of his predecessors like Acharya Kundakunda and Acharya Samantabhadra. He is rated as being the greatest of the early masters of Jain literature. He was prominent preceptor, with impeccable pontifical pedigree and spiritual lineage.  All of his work was written in Sanskrit, in prose as well as verse form. He was pontiff of the Nandi sangha, which was a part of the lineage of Acharya Kundakunda. He was the tenth guru of the pontifical lineage of the Nandi Sangha. He was born in a Brahmin family of Karnataka. 

It is likely that he was the first Jain saint to write not only on religion but also on non-religious subjects, such as ayurveda and Sanskrit grammar. Acharya Pujyapada, besides being a scholar on Jainism and a mendicant walking in the footsteps of the Jinas, was a grammarian, master of Sanskrit poetics and of ayurveda.

Pujyapada gave the definition of Dāna (charity) as the act of giving one's wealth to another for mutual benefit in Sarvarthasiddhi.

Works

 
 Jainābhiṣeka (Jain Anointment) - A work on Jain rituals.
 Chandaśāstra (Treatise on Prosody) - A work on Sanskrit prosody.

References

Citations

Sources
 
  
 
 
 

Jain acharyas
Indian Jain monks
5th-century Indian Jains
5th-century Jain monks
5th-century Indian monks
6th-century Indian Jains
6th-century Jain monks
6th-century Indian monks
464 births
524 deaths